The Big Slice is a 1991 American and Canadian comedy film directed by John Bradshaw. This film starring Casey Siemaszko, Leslie Hope, Louis Ferreira, Kenneth Welsh and Heather Locklear in the lead roles.

Cast
 Casey Siemaszko as Mike Sawyer
 Leslie Hope as Jenny Colter
 Louis Ferreira as Andy McCafferty
 Kenneth Welsh as Lieutenant Bernard
 Heather Locklear as Rita 
 Henry Ramer as Max Bernstein
 Brian Kaulback as Prison Guard
 Ellen Dubin as TV Reporter

References

External links
 
 

1991 films
American crime comedy films
Canadian crime comedy films
English-language Canadian films
1990s crime comedy films
Films shot in California
Films scored by Mychael Danna
1991 comedy films
Films directed by John Bradshaw (director)
1990s English-language films
1990s American films
1990s Canadian films